So, Communication (stylized as So, 通) is the seventh Korean-language EP by the South Korean band N.Flying. It was released by FNC Entertainment on June 10, 2020.

Background 
On May 28, 2020, the group announced in their official social media that they would be releasing their seventh mini album on June 10, 2020. The album was the first album with their new member, Seo Dong-sung, who joined the group earlier in 2020. The title song for this mini album was also revealed, which was "Oh really.".

On June 7, the track list for the album was released. On June 8, the group released the music video for the title track, "Oh really.". The music video was released two days prior to the official release date of their album. On June 10, the group released their album, So, Communication.

Track listing

Charts

References 

2020 EPs
FNC Entertainment EPs
Korean-language EPs